Acústico is a studio album/DVD combination from Spanish/Mexican pop rock group La 5ª Estación. The album features acoustic renditions of songs that were originally recorded on the band's first two albums, Primera Toma and Flores De Alquiler.

Track listing
"Daría" – 3:39 (Pontes, Villarrubia)
"Esperaré Despierta" – 4:00 (Jimenez)
"Rompe El Mar" – 3:31 (Jimenez)
"Niña" – 4:26 (Jimenez)
"Flores de Alquiler" – 3:40 (Pontes, Villarrubia)
"Perdición" – 4:04 (Jimenez)
"El Sol No Regresa" – 4:25 (Pontes, Villarrubia)
"Algo Más" – 7:33 (Avila, Jimenez)
"Busco Tu Piel" – 3:41 (Pontes, Villarrubia)
"Cuando Acaba La Noche" – 4:41 (Pontes)

Personnel
Armando Avila – directing, mixing, producer
Carlos Garcia – A&R
Guillermo Gutierrez Leyva – A&R
Juan Carlos Miguel – engineering
Gilda Oropeza – A&R
Jose Juan Sanchez – photography
Don C. Tyler – mastering

Certifications

References

La 5ª Estación albums
2005 albums